Schoolcraft State Park is a state park of Minnesota, USA, on the banks of the Mississippi River near Grand Rapids and Deer River. It was named for the explorer Henry Schoolcraft.

External links
Schoolcraft State Park

1959 establishments in Minnesota
Protected areas established in 1959
Protected areas of Cass County, Minnesota
Protected areas of Itasca County, Minnesota
Protected areas on the Mississippi River
State parks of Minnesota